The following is a list of the European rarities committees and equivalent bodies which comprise the membership of the Association of European Rarities Committees (AERC):

 The Avifaunistische Kommission (Austria)
 The Belarus Ornitho-Faunistic Commission (Belarus)
 The Commission d'Homologation (Belgium - Wallonia) and the Belgische Avifaunistische Homologatiecommissie (Belgium - Flanders)
 BUNARCO and the Bulgarian Society for the protection of Birds (Bulgaria)
 The Cyprus Rarities Committee (Cyprus)
 The Czech Faunistic Committee (Czech Republic)
 Sjaldenhedsudvalget (Denmark)
 Eesti Linnuharulduste Komisjon (Estonia)
 Suomen Lintutieteellisen Yhdistyksen Rariteettikomitea (Finland)
 Comite d'Homologation National and Commission de l'Avifaune Française (France)
 The Deutsche Seltenheitenkommission (Germany)
 The British Birds Rarities Committee and the British Ornithologists' Union Records Committee (Great Britain)
 George Handrinos (Greece)
 The Hungarian Rarities Committee (Hungary)
 Flækingsfuglanefndin (Iceland)
 The Irish Rare Birds Committee (Republic of Ireland)
 The Comitato di Omologazione Italiano (Italy)
 Latvijas Ornithofaunistikas Komisijas (Latvia)
 Lithuanian Raritie Commitie (Lietuvos ornitofaunistinė komisija) (Lithuania)
 The Luxemburger Homologations-Kommission (Luxembourg)
 Birdlife Malta (Malta)
 The Commissie Dwaalgasten Nedelerlandse Avifauna (Netherlands)
 The Norsk Sjeldenhetskomite for Fugle (Norway)
 The Komisja Faunistyczna (Poland)
 The Comité Português de Raridades (Portugal)
 The Societatea Ornitologica Româna (Romania)
 The Slovenska Ornithologicka Spolocnost (Slovakia)
 The Bird Watching & Bird Study Association of Slovenia (Slovenia)
 The Comite de Rarezas de SEO (Spain)
 The Sveriges Ornitologiska Förenings Raritetskommitte (Sweden)
 The Schweizerische Avifaunistische Kommission (Switzerland)
 The Ukrainian Avifaunistic Commission (Ukraine)